Urazbayevo (Uraźbay) is a rural locality (a village) in Akyulovsky Selsoviet, Khaybullinsky District, Bashkortostan, Russia. The population was 147 as of 2010. There are 5 streets.

Geography 
Urazbayevo is located 32 km northeast of Akyar (the district's administrative centre) by road.

References 

Rural localities in Khaybullinsky District